Novo Sancti Petri is a resort town in the municipality of Chiclana de la Frontera in the province of Cádiz, Andalusia, southwestern Spain. It lies along the Playa de la Barrosa to the south of the main town of Chiclana. It is known for its high number of golf courses and hotels, covering an area of about 4000 hectares. The municipality contains the largest number of hotel beds in the province of Cadiz and the Costa de la Luz and has about 20 luxury hotels which are 4 or 5 star. Notable golf courses include the 36-hole Club de Golf Novo Sancti Petri, the 18-hole Club de Golf Melia Sancti Petri, the 9-hole Club de Golf Campano, European Golfes Academy, Escuela de golf Practeegolf and Campo de golf Lomas de Sancti Petri. It also includes the Barceló Sancti Petri Spa Resort.

References

External links
 Official site
 

Costa de la Luz
Populated places in the Province of Cádiz
Resorts in Spain
Seaside resorts in Spain
Golf in Spain
Chiclana de la Frontera